Jean-Jacques Augier (born 23 October 1953) is a French publisher and businessman. He previously worked as an inspector of finances, and was treasurer for the 2012 presidential election campaign of previous French president Francois Hollande. Hollande and Augier had been classmates at the National School of Administration(ENA). Augier made international headlines in 2013 after an investigation published by The Guardian newspaper and the International Consortium of Investigative Journalists found that he held substantial offshore holdings in the Cayman Islands, listed under "International Booksores LTD." His partner in his offshore firm, Xi Shu, is a member of the Chinese People’s Political Consultative Conference. Since January, 2013, he is also the owner of French gay magazine Têtu.

References

1953 births
Living people
French publishers (people)
Place of birth missing (living people)